Caroline Georgina Corr MBE (born 17 March 1973), known to fans as the "Chick with the Stick", is an Irish singer and drummer for the Celtic folk rock band The Corrs. In addition to the drums, Corr plays the bodhrán, cajón, percussions and piano.

The Corr siblings were appointed honorary MBEs in 2005, in recognition of their music and charitable work, which has raised money for the Freeman Hospital in Newcastle upon Tyne, victims of the Omagh Bombing and other charities.

Early life 
Corr was born on 17 March, 1973 (Saint Patrick's Day) in Dundalk, Ireland, to Jean and Gerry Corr. Corr has four siblings: an older sister Sharon Corr, older brother Jim Corr and a younger sister Andrea Corr. Older brother Gerard was killed when he was only three years old in a road accident before she and her sister Andrea were born. Andrea discussed the devastating death with Ryan Tubridy on The Late Late Show aired by RTÉ Entertainment. Caroline was brought up in a Catholic household and was sent to the same school, Dun Lughaidh Convent, as her sisters.

Her parents played ballads and folk tunes in local bands, and formed their own band called "Sound Affair". Jean sang and Gerry played the keyboards and they performed covers of songs by various famous bands. Caroline and her siblings were exposed to music from a very young age, and travelled with Jean and Gerry to gigs in the family car.

Caroline was taught the piano by her father Gerry at a very early age like her other siblings. She also learnt the bodhrán by watching videos of traditional Irish musicians playing it. The violin was originally intended for Caroline to play but she showed no interest and instead Sharon took up the violin lessons. Caroline learned how to play the drums with the help of a former boyfriend who gave her the lessons. From then on, her drum skills were self taught.

She performed No Frontiers, a cover of a Jimmy MacCarthy song, on The Corrs Unplugged along with her sister Sharon.

In 2020, Corr was part of an Irish collective of female singers and musicians called "Irish Women in Harmony", that recorded a version of Dreams in aid of the charity SafeIreland, which deals with domestic abuse which had reportedly risen significantly during the COVID-19 lockdown.

Career

Personal life 
Corr married Frank Woods, a property developer and boyfriend of many years, on 22 August 2002, in Majorca, Spain. Their first child, Jake Gerard Woods, was born on 12 February 2003. The boy was named after Caroline's late brother, Gerard Corr Jr., who was hit by a car while retrieving a football in the road. The couple's first daughter, Georgina Woods, was born on 11 October 2004. This led to Corr taking some time off from the band's activities. On 1 December 2006 she welcomed a second daughter, Ryanne Andrea Woods, her third child with Frank. The couple separated in October 2020.

Honours and awards
In April 2002, she was awarded the Rory Gallagher Musician Award at the Hot Press Irish Music Awards held at held at the BBC's Blackstaff studios in Belfast.

Discography

Albums 
 1995: Forgiven Not Forgotten
 1997: Talk on Corners
 2000: In Blue
 2004: Borrowed Heaven
 2005: Home
 2015: White Light
 2017: Jupiter Calling

Compilations and remix albums 
 2001: Best of The Corrs
 2006: Dreams: The Ultimate Corrs Collection
 2007: The Works

Live albums 
 1997: The Corrs - Live
 1999: The Corrs Unplugged
 2002: VH1 Presents: The Corrs, Live in Dublin

References

External links 
 

1973 births
Living people
21st-century drummers
Bodhrán players
Honorary Members of the Order of the British Empire
Irish rock drummers
Irish women singers
Musicians from County Louth
People from Dundalk
The Corrs members
Women drummers